Primitive Dance is a 1987 album by Irish singer/songwriter Paul Brady, his fifth solo album. The song "The Awakening" features the vocals of Irish singer Moya Brennan. Mark Knopfler guests on guitar on The Game Of Love track.

Track listing
Steal Your Heart Away - 5:45 
The Soul Commotion - 3:39  
Paradise Is Here - 5:00   
It's Gonna Work Out Fine - 3:53   
The Awakening - 5:58   
Eat The Peach - 5:33    
Don't Start Knocking - 5:06   
Just In Case Of Accidents - 5:12  
The Game Of Love - 4:04

External links
 Primitive Dance on  Amazon

1987 albums
Paul Brady albums
Mercury Records albums